The 1958 Little All-America college football team is composed of college football players from small colleges and universities who were selected by the Associated Press (AP) as the best players at each position. For 1958, the AP selected three teams of 11 players each, with no separate defensive platoons.

The first-team backfield included: quarterback John Greene who led Chattanooga to an upset victory over Tennessee; Robert Webb of St. Ambrose who gained 1,592 yards; and Ed Meador of Arkansas Tech who averaged 150 yards per game.

Guard Carlos Gonzales of Cal Poly was the only junior chosen for the first team and the heaviest player selected at 230 pounds.

First team
 Back - John Greene (senior, 6'2", 190 pounds), Chattanooga
 Back - Sam McCord (senior, 5'10", 172 pounds), East Texas
 Back - Robert Webb (senior, 6'1", 201 pounds), St. Ambrose
 Back - Ed Meador (senior, 6'1", 180 pounds), Arkansas Tech
 End - Robert Yencho (senior, 6'1", 195 pounds), Mississippi Southern
 End - Tom Taylor (senior, 6'2", 190 pounds), Albion
 Tackle - Richard Emerich (senior, 6'2", 225 pounds), West Chester
 Tackle - Robert Baake (senior, 6'1", 190 pounds), Wheaton
 Guard - Carlos Gonzalez (junior, 5'10", 230 pounds), Cal Poly
 Guard - Charles Davis (senior, 5'9", 200 pounds), McMurry
 Center - William Long (senior, 6'1", 218 pounds), Willamette

Second team
 Back - William Benson, Hampden-Sydney
 Back - Charles Tolar, Northwest Louisiana
 Back - Wesley Gideon, Trinity (Texas)
 Back - George Dixon, Bridgeport
 End - Jerry Richardson, Wofford
 End - Peter Kasson, Ripon
 Tackle - Larry Termolen, Hope
 Tackle - Glenn Morgan, Flagstaff State
 Guard - Larry Palvino, Rochester
 Guard - Claude Pellingsly, Northeast Oklahoma
 Center - Michael Banyas, East Tennessee

Third team
 Back - William Berrier, Juniata
 Back - Junior Wolfe, Panhandle A&M
 Back - Robert Swiggum, Gustavus Adolphus
 Back - Fred Cason, Tampa
 End - Nicholas Bottini, Buffalo
 End - Joe Driskill, Northeast Louisiana
 Tackle - Richard Cahill, Humboldt
 Tackle - Larry MaGuire, Central Washington
 Guard - George Worley, St. Benedict’s
 Guard - James Hardin, Western Kentucky
 Center - Joe Murphy, Lenoir Rhyne

See also
 1958 College Football All-America Team

References

Little All-America college football team
Little All-America college football team
Little All-America college football teams